My Sister's Keeper is a 2009 American drama film directed by Nick Cassavetes and starring Cameron Diaz, Abigail Breslin, Sofia Vassilieva, Jason Patric, and Alec Baldwin. Based on Jodi Picoult's 2004 novel of the same name, on June 26, 2009, the film was released to cinemas in the United States, Canada, Ireland, Mexico, and the United Kingdom.

Plot
Conceived via in vitro fertilization, 11-year old Anna Fitzgerald was born as a savior sister for her 15-year-old sister, Kate, who has acute promyelocytic leukemia, as neither her parents, firefighter Brian and lawyer Sara, nor 18-year-old brother Jesse are a genetic match. Beginning with the harvest of her umbilical cord at birth, Anna has donated compatible blood and stem cells to Kate, and her life is one of hospitalizations, growth hormone injections, opioid painkillers, sleeping pills, bleeding, and infections. Sara has no qualms over using Anna's body to treat Kate's, and fully believes she is doing so willingly, while Brian is closer to Anna and has his own misgivings.

After Kate goes into kidney failure, Anna – with Jesse's help – approaches attorney Campbell Alexander, and tells him she wishes to sue for medical emancipation, on the basis that she will be required to donate one of hers, and that having just a single kidney will severely restrict her quality of life. Campbell, whose covert epilepsy lends him sympathy to her predicament, decides to take her case pro bono and, representing Anna as her guardian ad litem, he files a suit for partial termination of parental rights. This immediately causes a rift between Anna and Sara, and Brian moves Anna into his fire station to separate them.

Flashbacks detail Kate and Anna's close relationship and how Kate's illness has affected Jesse, who has run away from his summer camp. Kate meets a fellow cancer patient, Taylor, and they begin dating. They slow-dance at the hospital's prom for teen patients and later have sex. A few days later, Kate is upset to have not seen Taylor since. Learning that Taylor has died, she attempts suicide by overdosing on painkillers but Anna stops her. Kate expresses hope that after she dies she will see Taylor.

After Sara is unable to get the suit thrown out, Anna's case proceeds to trial. Shortly before the hearing, Kate requests to go to the beach one last time. Brian obtains permission and discharges her from the hospital for the day. Sara demands that Kate be returned to the hospital, but Brian refuses and threatens to divorce Sara if she does not join them. They enjoy one final family outing.

At the hearing, Jesse witnesses Sara's aggressive cross-examination of Anna on the stand, and finally having had enough, he forces Anna to reveal that she is in fact acting under Kate's wishes, and not her own. While Anna had genuinely wanted to donate her kidney, Kate – having endured 11 years of her own and her family's suffering – had asked her to refuse. Sara is forced to acknowledge what Kate has been trying to tell her for a long time, that she is ready to die. Kate dies in her sleep later that day with her mother by her side.

After Kate's death, Campbell reports that Anna has won the case. Now reconciled, the family moves on with their lives. Sara, who gave up practicing law to look after Kate, returns to work, Brian retires from firefighting and counsels troubled youths, and Jesse enters college. Anna reveals that every year on Kate's birthday, they go to Montana, which was her "most favorite place in the world". She concludes that she was not born merely to save her sister, she was born because she had a sister, and that their relationship continues even in death.

Cast

Production
Upon the original creation of the film adaptation, sisters Dakota and Elle Fanning were cast to play Kate and Anna respectively. However, when Dakota heard that she would be required to shave her head for the role, she dropped out of the film as then did Elle. The two sisters were replaced, with Abigail Breslin taking on the lead role as Anna Fitzgerald and Sofia Vassilieva on the role of Kate Fitzgerald. Jodi Picoult said in interview she regretted letting Cassavetes direct the film, as he changed its ending from her novel.

Reception

Critical response
My Sister's Keeper received mixed reviews from critics. Rotten Tomatoes reports that 48% of reviews for the film were positive, based on 138 reviews, with an average rating of 5.50/10. The website's critical consensus reads, "My Sister's Keeper gets fine performances from its adult and child actors, but the director's heavy-handed approach turns a worthy emotional subject into an overly melodramatic tearjerker." Another aggregate review site Metacritic reported 51% positive reviews based on 28 reviews.

Box office
In its opening weekend, it placed fifth with a total of $12,442,212, behind Transformers: Revenge of the Fallen, The Proposal (second weekend), The Hangover (fourth weekend), and Up (fifth weekend). The film left theatres on October 8, 2009, with a domestic total of $49,200,230 with a further $46,459,927 from foreign markets. It has grossed $95,660,157 worldwide.

Awards

Soundtrack
Trailer:
 Vega4 – "Life Is Beautiful"
TV spot:
 James Blunt – "Carry You Home"
 Plain White T's – "1, 2, 3, 4"
 Tyrone Wells – "More"
Movie:
 Don Ho – "Tiny Bubbles"
 E.G. Daily – "Life Is Just a Bowl of Cherries"
 Priscilla Ahn – "Find My Way Back Home"
 Jimmy Scott – "Heaven"
 Regina Spektor – "Better"
 Jonah Johnson – "With You"
 Greg Laswell – "Girls Just Want to Have Fun"
 Pete Yorn – "Don't Wanna Cry"
 Phil Xenidis – "Kill Me"
 Jeff Buckley – "We All Fall in Love Sometimes"
 Edwina Hayes – "Feels Like Home"
 Hana Pestle – "These Two Hands"

References

External links

 
 
 
 

2009 films
2000s legal drama films
American legal drama films
Films about cancer
Films about death
Films about dysfunctional families
Films about lawyers
Films about sisters
Films based on works by Jodi Picoult
Films directed by Nick Cassavetes
Films scored by Aaron Zigman
Films set in California
2009 drama films
New Line Cinema films
Warner Bros. films
Medical ethics in fiction
2000s English-language films
2000s American films